The YPG International or People's Protection Units International (Kurdish: YPG Enternasyonel) is a military unit made up of foreign fighters in the Syrian Democratic Forces. It was created in December 2016 as the Antifascist International Tabûr (AIT) of the People's Protection Units (YPG). The unit is part of the Syrian Democratic Forces in the Syrian Civil War.

Establishment and campaigns 
The brigade was founded in December 2016, and elected as its first commander the Italian-Moroccan Karim Marcello Franceschi. The battalion emerged from a proposal for foreign fighters to serve in an English-speaking unit, as opposed to the International Freedom Battalion, where the predominant language is Turkish.

The unit is composed mostly of people from Western Europe and the United States, including communists, socialists and anarchists. The unit's initial statement mentioned their principles and causes, highlighting the common unity between communists and anarchists as an anti-fascist front against the Islamic State of Iraq and the Levant. The statement was released in several languages, including English, Italian, Spanish and Basque.

The unit took part in the 2016 Manbij offensive, the Raqqa campaign (2016-2017), the Deir ez-Zor campaign (2017-19), and the resistance to the 2018 Turkish invasion of Afrin and the 2019 Turkish offensive into northeastern Syria.

See also 
 International Freedom Battalion
 International Brigades
 Foreign fighters in the Syrian and Iraqi Civil Wars
 Rojava conflict

References

Further reading 

 Gifford, Macer. Fighting Evil: The Ordinary Man who went to War Against ISIS. Seven Dials (2020).
 Stoddard, Warren II. A Good Place on the Banks of the Euphrates: Stories from the War Against ISIS. Pine Needle Floor (2021).

Internationalism
Military units and factions of the Syrian civil war
People's Protection Units
2016 establishments in Syria